Eron Riley (born August 5, 1987) is a former American football wide receiver. Riley was signed by the Baltimore Ravens as an undrafted free agent in 2009. Riley played college football at Duke.

Riley has also been a member of the Carolina Panthers, Denver Broncos, and New York Jets.

Professional career

Baltimore Ravens
Eron Riley was signed by the Baltimore Ravens as an undrafted free agent. Riley was released by the Baltimore Ravens on September 4, 2010 after not playing in a regular season game.

Carolina Panthers
Riley was signed to the Carolina Panthers' practice squad on October 11, 2010. Riley was released five days later.

Denver Broncos
The Denver Broncos signed Riley to the team's practice squad on October 19, 2010.

New York Jets
The New York Jets signed Riley to their active roster on October 19, 2011. He was released by the Jets on December 28. Riley was signed to the team's practice squad the next day. Riley was waived on August 31, 2012.

Saskatchewan Roughriders
On April 19, 2013, it was announced Riley was signed by the Saskatchewan Roughriders of the CFL. He was released by the Roughriders on October 21, 2014.

References

External links
Denver Broncos bio 
Blue Devils bio 

1987 births
Living people
American football wide receivers
Baltimore Ravens players
Carolina Panthers players
Denver Broncos players
New York Jets players
Duke Blue Devils football players
Players of American football from Savannah, Georgia
Saskatchewan Roughriders players